P S Suvin may refer to:
 Suvin, Meyaneh
 Suvin, Sarab
 Suvin, P S